William Whitmire (born August 24, 1948) is an American politician. He is a member of the South Carolina House of Representatives from the 1st District, serving since 2003. He is a member of the Republican party.

Whitmire serves as Chair of the College and University Trustee Screening Commission, a Joint Committee with members from the House and Senate.

Early life and education 
Whitmire was born on August 24, 1948, to Ramsey and Marie Fagan Whitmire. He is a graduate of Piedmont College.

Career 
Whitmire is a retired educator in the School District of Oconee County. He was also a member of the United States Army Reserves from 1971 to 1977. Whitmire also served on the Walhalla city council and served as the mayor before being elected to the South Carolina House of Representatives in 2003.

Personal life 
Whitmire is married to Kathy Lynn Pittard. They have 3 children.

References

Living people
1948 births
Republican Party members of the South Carolina House of Representatives
People from Seneca, South Carolina
21st-century American politicians